İsmet İnönü Stadium, formerly Çilekli Football Field, is a football stadium of the Beşiktaş municipality at 4. Levent neighborhood of Beşiktaş district in Istanbul, Turkey.

It was built in 2001. Owned by the district municipality of Beşiktaş, it is operated by Beltaş. The facility has 800 seating capacity. The field's surface is artificial turf. It has floodlight installed.

Beşiktaş J.K. women's football team play some of their home matches at Çilekli Football Field.

The stadium was renamed to honor Turkish statesman İsmet İnönü (1884–1973) by a decision of the Beşiktaş municipal council in April 2018. The venue is home to football matches of the Turkish Amateur Football Leagues.

References

Sports venues in Istanbul
Football venues in Turkey
Beşiktaş J.K. facilities
Sport in Beşiktaş
Sports venues completed in 2001
2001 establishments in Turkey